Justice Dixon may refer to:

Jane Dixon (judge), judge of the Supreme Court of Victoria
John Dixon (judge), judge of the Supreme Court of Victoria
Jonathan Dixon (judge), associate justice of the New Jersey Supreme Court
John Allen Dixon Jr., associate justice of the Louisiana Supreme Court
Luther S. Dixon, chief justice of the Wisconsin Supreme Court
Sir Owen Dixon (1886–1972), sixth chief justice of Australia
William C. Dixon, associate justice of the Ohio Supreme Court

See also
Brian Dickson (1916–1998), Canadian judge, and Chief Justice of Canada 1984–1990